StoneGate Christian Academy (SGCA) is a private Christian school  educating students entering high school, elementary and pre-school. It opened as a ministry of the Shady Grove Church in 1976 and became an independent 503(c) organization in April 2005. They are located near Highways 183 and 161 in Irving, Texas.

References

External links
 StoneGate Christian Academy
 Our School
 StoneGate Academics
 StoneGate Admissions
 High School Athletics
 StoneGate Contact us
 Elementary Student Life

1976 establishments in Texas
Educational institutions established in 1976
Education in Irving, Texas
High schools in Irving, Texas
Christian schools in Texas
Private K-12 schools in Dallas County, Texas